TechXetra was the National Level Annual Techno-Cultural Festival of Tezpur University, India. TechXetra is a combination of two words- Tech and Xetra. 'Tech' refers to Technology and 'Xetra' meaning terrain. It was one of the most common platforms in North-East India to showcase knowledge and intellect. A blend of different technical and management events, it had cultural events as well. TechXetra used to attract enthusiasts from various parts of India. It was one of those technical festivals of North-East India, which reached out to both engineering and non-engineering students. It was sometimes abbreviated as Tx in social networking websites.

Tezpur University (a Central University)

Tezpur University is an Indian Central University, established by an Act of Parliament in 1994 in Tezpur, Assam. It is situated in a place of scenic beauty called Napaam surrounded by greenery and many historic and tourist places. It offers employment oriented and interdisciplinary courses in Engineering, Humanities, Business Administration, Science and many others, to meet the regional as well as the national aspirations and the development of the state of Assam and India. It also promotes research in areas, which are of special and direct relevance to the region, and in the emerging areas in Science and Technology.

TechXetra (Over the years)
TechXetra saw the light of the day on 17 October 2008. Its main vision was to provide a platform for the budding technical and non-technical students of North-East India to showcase their talents in their respective fields of interest. In 2009, it made an effort to bring in the necessary resources and innovative events. TechXetra 2010 emerged out to be one of the most technically sound festivals of the region. It had a good blend of science and technology coalesced with cultural events. It had more than 30 events and witnessed large participation.

TechXetra 2011 was organised with more than 45 competitive events, besides workshops conducted by firms, debate competitions, quizzes with quiz-master Mr. Ochintya Sharma, President, Karnataka Quiz Association etc.

The invited speakers in the lecture series were:

 Dr T Ramasami, currently Secretary to the Government of India, Department of Science and Technology (India).
 Air Marshall P. K. Barbora, Vice Chief of the Air Staff.
 Nitin Gupta, Founder and CEO, Entertainment Engineers.
 Mr. Ochintya Sharma, Vice President in Samsung India.

The Indian death metal band Bhayanak Maut performed and judged the finals of Metanoia 2011, the rock band competition. Also, there was a performance by Anushka Manchanda on the last night of TechXetra 2011.

TechXetra 2012 had more than 60 competitive events, along with technical workshops, debate competitions and quiz with Mr. Vijay Anand Menon, Economic Times Young Achiever, 2011 etc.

The invited speakers included were:

 A NASA webinar with astronaut Michael Fincke
 Dr J. Narayana Das, Outstanding Scientist, Chief Controller R&D, D.R.D.O..
 Mr. Balasaheb Darade, Ex. N.A.S.A. Engineer.
 Mr. Kanak Gogoi, Innovator.
 Mr. Jamshed V. Rajan, C.P.O., Nimbuzz India.

Euphoria, one of the most popular and oldest bands in India, ended the journey of Techxetra 2012.

TechXetra 2013 was organized from 25 to 27 October 2013 with more than 70 different events which included various technical, creative and cultural events. Techxetra 2013 was held on the theme of Water:Wherewithal with Wisdom to promote water conservation in accordance with United Nation's International Year of Water Cooperation.

The invited speakers in the lecture series were:
A CERN webinar with physicist Dr. Rolf Landua.
Juergen Reinhard, Life cycle Assessment specialist, EMPA, Technology and society unit, Switzerland.
Dr K Viswanathan, retired Deputy Director of Indian Space Research Organisation
Team Indus, a Delhi-based aerospace researched team.

Sycorax from Darjeeling was the headlining band in Metanoia. Bollywood singer Benny Dayal performed on the last night.

TechXetra 2014 was scheduled from 17 October 2014 to 19 October 2014. There were various technical, cultural and creative events which were made a big success through active participation from over 100+ schools and colleges across the region. With the theme 'Bridging the digital divide', techXetra 2014 left a lasting impression on all who became a part of the fiesta. Social initiatives taken includes : Donations were made after collection of funds from various sources to Nabaprabhat orphanage at Tezpur, voter awareness rally conducted in collaboration with the Election Commission of India, a social up-gradation program with nearby school children based on the theme was conducted to introduce them to the benefits of internet and computers and more.

The notable speakers in the lecture series included :
 Alok Mukherjee (DRDO) – Head of Robotics.
 I.V. Rao : Maruti Suzuki – Managing Executive Officer.
 Swati Sammadar: Corporate Affairs – Strategic relationship, South Asia at Intel Technology India Pvt. Ltd.
The cultural half of the fest was graced with performances of Yonsample, DJ Candice Redding at Sunburn and the fest concluded

with Parikrama performing before a crowd of over 6000.

TechXetra 2015 was organised from 30 October 2015 to 1 November 2015. There were various events from all genres which experienced participation from all across the region. The theme for the year was "Empowering Peace and Security: A Tech-step Forward".
The notable speakers of the lecture series included:
Prof.Jitendra Nath Goswami, Scientist
Mr. M.L. Stone, Entrepreneur
Mr. Uttam Kumar Mishra
Prof. D.N. Buragohain, Alumni, IIT Bombay
The cultural section of the festival saw performances from DJ Tejas and Underside headlining Metanoia. The final night concluded with a performance from Bollywood singer Aditi Singh Sharma.

TechXetra 2016 was organised from 4 November 2016 to 6 November 2016. It saw participation from 100+ schools and 25,000+ footfalls. The theme for the year was "Ideas, Opportunities and Beyond".
The notable speakers of the lecture series included:
Shombit Ghosh, Lieutenant Colonel, Indian Army
Uddhab Bharali, Innovator
Dr. Bindu Dey, DST
Professor Dr. Ramesh C. Deka, V.C., Assam Down Town University

The cultural section of the fest saw performances from DJ Berry Gangsta and Aberrant headlining Metanoia. The final night concluded with a performance from the popular band Astitva.

TechXetra 2017 - Reboot, the tenth edition of the techno-cultural fest was a huge success. It was organized from 3 November 2017 to 5 November 2017.

The various events and their description are mentioned below:

Apart from the above events, there were also workshops on Bluetooth Robotics, Game Development, Tall Building Design, Placement Grooming, Smart City Planning.

Various personalities like the notable author Adithya Iyer were invited.

Metanoia 2017 was headlined by the Pune-based band Noiseware. On the same night, modern post-rock band aswekeepsearching performed.

On 5 November, Raghu Dixit, the famous folk and fusion artist performed.

Modules
Events in TechXetra:

 Robotics
 There are five robotics events in this module. Here, the participants are to design and build robots, manual or automatic, confronting to some pre-defined norms.

 DColloseum
 The gaming events include five worldwide popular PC games. The participants in teams test their mettle and skill against other in different gaming events.

 Management
 TechXetra is also dedicated to management brains. Events such as the 'B-plan', 'the Dalal Street', and 'Ad vantage' are the prime attractions. The high voltage personality test 'D Hot seat' is in this module.

 Workshops
 TechXetra has technical workshops to offer which change from year to year.

 Creation
 Here, participants show their creativity by the digi-shooting, capturing moments in their cameras or by mobile shooting. Also there is the debating event 'Wrangle' and imaginative writing events such as 'Wordsmith' and 'Mirage'.

 Impulse
 'Nirmaan', 'Constrolix'- the structure maker contest and 'Circuitrix', besides decoding and other software skills comprise the module.

 Cultural
 Four nights of cultural extravaganza, confluence of classical, eastern, rock and western genre of music featuring some well-known musicians of the country and to add to these a cultural attire showcasing on ramp and Dj nite. Also, there are movie screenings at the University auditorium.

 Armed forces exhibition/Air show
 An exhibition of arms and technology used by the Indian Army . Organised under the IV Corps headquartered in Tezpur.

 D podium
 Eminent personalities share their life experiences, imparting their knowledge, virtue and expertise, which make up a very tranquil atmosphere among the listeners. People from diverse field like Air Marshall A K Gogoi, Pramod Joshi, and many more have graced the occasion in TechXetra 2010.

 Full Throttle
 This quiz event conducted by renowned quiz-masters of India is on the last day of TechXetra. Also, there is the inter school quiz event 'Full Swing'.

 Online Zone
 The official website of TechXetra, houses online events and activities. One needs to get logged in and get ready for brain twist. Includes puzzles, quizzes and lot more.

See also
 Central University, India
 List of Engineering Colleges in Assam

References

External links

 
 Official website of Tezpur University

Tezpur University
2008 establishments in Assam
Festivals in Assam
Festivals established in 2008
Technical festivals in India